Renata Dancewicz (born 7 February 1969 in Leszno, Poland) is a Polish actress and member of the Polish Bridge Union. In 1988 she graduated from the 1st Mikołaj Kopernik High School in Lubin. In 2006 Dancewicz danced in the Taniec z Gwiazdami (Polish version of the Dancing with the Stars).

She's an atheist and an advocate for women's rights.

Filmography 

 1993: Do widzenia wczoraj
 1993: Samowolka (A.W.O.L.)
 1994: Oczy niebieskie (Blue Eyes)
 1994: Komedia małżeńska (Matrimonial Comedy)
 1994-1995: Radio Romans (Radio Romance)
 1995: Die Schönste Sache der Welt
 1995: Ekstradycja
 1995: Diabelska edukacja (Devilish Education)
 1995: Deborah
 1995: Pułkownik Kwiatkowski  (Colonel Kwiatkowski)
 1995: Tato
 1997: Ekstradycja 2
 1997: Svenska Hjältar (Swedish Heroes)
 1998: Gniew (Anger)
 1999: Ekstradycja 3
 1999: Siedlisko
 2000: Sukces
 2002: Eukaliptus
 2002: E=mc²
 2003: Zostać miss 2
 2003-2008: Na Wspólnej
 2006: Kryminalni
 2008: 33 Scenes from Life
 2010: Blecanto

References

External links 
Renata Dancewicz at filmpolski.pl

Polish actresses
Polish film actresses
1969 births
Living people
Polish atheists
Polish feminists